Irvino English (23 October 1977 – 27 February 2020) was a Jamaican footballer who played as a midfielder.

Club career
English spent his entire club career with Waterhouse, playing for them between 1999 and 2011. During the 2006-07 season, he finished as the league's top goal scorer with 18 goals.

International career
English earned seven caps for the Jamaica national team between 1999 and 2002, which included one FIFA World Cup qualifying match.

Death
English was murdered on 27 February 2020.

References

1977 births
2020 deaths
Jamaican footballers
Afro-Jamaican
Jamaica international footballers
Waterhouse F.C. players
National Premier League players
Association football midfielders
Male murder victims
Jamaican murder victims
People murdered in Jamaica